Vučevica is a village in the Split-Dalmatia County, Croatia. The settlement is administered as a part of Klis municipality.
According to national census of 2011, population of the settlement is 56.

Sources

Populated places in Split-Dalmatia County